Spreadthesign is an international online dictionary for several of the world's different sign languages. 
By searching for words and sentences you can see the corresponding signs. In the beginning there where only six sign languages represented. Spreadthesign is managed by the Non-governmental organization European Sign Language Centre in Örebro, Sweden. The organization is financed by funds through different projects and a lot of the work is supported by volunteers. Today there are more than 380,000 videos in the database of Spreadthesign and the work to expand the number of videos and sign languages is an ongoing process.

The sign languages represented in Spreadthesign are American Sign Language (ASL), Austrian Sign Language (ÖGS), Belarusian Sign Language, Brazilian Sign Language (LIBRAS), British Sign Language (BSL), Chilean Sign Language (LSCH), Cuban Sign Language, Cypriot Sign Language, Bulgarian Sign Language, Chinese Sign Language (CSL), Croatian Sign Language, (HZJ) Czech Sign Language, Estonian Sign Language (ESL), Finnish Sign Language, French Sign Language (LSF), German Sign Language (DGS), Greek Sign Language, Icelandic Sign Language, Indian Sign Language, Italian Sign Language (LIS), Japanese Sign Language (JSL), Latvian Sign Language, Lithuanian Sign Language (LGK), Mexican Sign Language (LSM), Polish Sign Language (PJM), Portuguese Sign Language, Romanian Sign Language, Russian Sign Language, Spanish Sign Language (LSE), Swedish Sign Language (SSL), Turkish Sign Language (TİD), Ukrainian Sign Language (USL) and Pakistan Sign Language (PSL)

The written languages represented in Spreadthesign are American English, Belarusian, British English, Bulgarian, Chinese, Croatian, Czech, English (India), Estonian, Finnish, French, German (Austria), German (Germany), Greek (Cyprus), Greek (Greece), Hindi, Icelandic, Italian, Japanese, Latvian, Lithuanian, Polish, Portuguese (Brazil), Portuguese (Portugal), Romanian, Russian (Belarus), Russian (Russia), Spanish (Chile), Spanish (Cuba), Spanish (Mexico), Spanish (Spain), Swedish, Turkish, Ukrainian, Urdu (Pakistan).

At the inauguration at the Ministry for Foreign Affairs (Sweden) on March 31, 2009, several Swedish dignitaries were present. Among them were Queen Silvia of Sweden, the Minister of Education Jan Björklund and the minister of culture Lena Adelsohn Liljeroth.

During the period 2016–2018, extensive work has been done to heighten the quality of the dictionary.

Spreadthesign is available as a free learning tool both as a website and an app.

References

External links
Official website
European Sign Language Centre

Sign language